Adel is a given name of ancient European origins that evolved from words meaning "noble", "nobility" or "elite".

It is derived primarily from the languages of north-western Europe, which include English, French, Luxembourgish, German, Dutch, Frisian, Danish, Norwegian, Swedish, Finnish, Faroese, and Icelandic. Today, "Adel" is a gender-neutral given name and short form of given names with this combining element.

Nordic variants of the name include Ådel, Ädel, Ádel, and Ædel. German and Dutch variants of the name include Adal and Edel. French variants of the name include Édel and Adél (not to be confused with Adèle). Adelson and Adelaide are notable masculine and feminine forms. Adelle (Adèle) is a popular feminine alternative.

Although global, Adel remains prominent in north-western European countries. It can also be found as a family name with or without an affix (such as de Adel, den Adel, or van Adel).

The earliest known woman with the name was Princess Adel of Liege (born ). The earliest known man with the name was King Adel of Sweden (born ). His son's name was Adelson< The legendary king of the Frisians and founder of the kingdom, Friso, had a son named Adel (later king of Frisia), supposedly born in the 3rd century BC.

Adel is an exemplar of a monothematic name. It is also the root of the names Adelais, Aderic, Adolf, Albert, and Alice, and their variants in other languages.

It is not related to the Arabic name Adil, also spelled Adel, which derives from the root 'ādil, meaning just or equitable.

Origins

Ancient words 
The name derives from Old Dutch "ōþil", Old German "adal", Old Norse "aðal", Old French "œ̄ðel", and Old English "æðel" by evolution of proto-Germanic "aþalą" (meaning "noble" and "kin") and "ōþilą" (meaning "inheritance" and "rule of the land").

Today, "adel" is used throughout much of north-western Europe as the word for nobility.

Popularity

Globally 
Adel was found over 4,000 times as a family name and over 15,000 times as a given name in 55 different countries. It is a relatively rare name. Aside from Nordic countries, it is most prominent in the United States, the United Kingdom, France, and Russia.

Pronunciation

Variations

Other languages

Other forms

Given name

Royalty 
 Adel I Friso of Friesland (died ), King of Friesland
 Adel II Atharik of Friesland (died ), King of Friesland
 Adel III Ubbo of Friesland (died ), King of Friesland
 Adel IV Asega Askar of Friesland (died ), King of Friesland

Arts and entertainment

Acting 

 Adel Adham (1928–1996), Egyptian actor
 Adel Bencherif (born 1975), French actor
 Adel Emam (born 1940), Egyptian film, television, and stage actor
 Adel Abo Hassoon (born 1970), Syrian television actor and voice actor
 Adel Karam (born 1972), Lebanese actor, comedian, and TV presenter

Art 

 Adel Abdessemed (born 1971), Algerian contemporary artist
 Adel Nassief (1962–2021), Egyptian painter
 Adel Rootstein (1930–1992), British mannequin designer

Music 
 Adel Dahdal, Swedish record producer and mix engineer
 Adel Heinrich (1926–2022), American composer, organist, and university teacher
 Adel Kamel (1942–2003), Egyptian music critic, musicologist, and composer
 Adel Souto (born 1969), American musician
 Adel Tawil (born 1978), German singer, songwriter, and producer

Writing 

 Adel Esmat (born 1959), Egyptian novelist
 Adel Karasholi (born 1936), Syrian writer
 Adel Khozam, Emirati poet
 Adel Manna (born 1947), Palestinian historian

Business 
 Adel Al-Ghamdi, Saudi businessman
 Adel Hassan Al A'ali (born 1957), Bahraini businessman
 Adel Chaveleh, American businessman and CIO of Crane Worldwide Logistics

Military 

 Adel Al Toraifi (born 1979), Saudi journalist and affair specialist
 Adel Emara, Egyptian general
 Adel Flaifel, Bahraini colonel
 Adel Khalil, Egyptian Air Defense Force Commander

Politics
 Adel Abdel-Hamid (born 1939), Egyptian politician and judge
 Adel Al-Saraawi, Kuwaiti politician
 Adel Al Asoomi (born 1969), Bahraini politician and businessman
 Adel Darwish, British political journalist, reporter, author, historian, broadcaster, and political commentator
 Adel Fakeih (born 1959), Saudi Arabian politician and engineer
 Adel Hussein (1932–2001), Egyptian political activist and journalist
 Adel Labib, Egyptian politician
 Adel Mouwda, Bahraini politician
 Adel Murad (1949–2018), Iraqi politician
 Adel Najafzadeh (born 1973), Iranian politician
 Adel Osseiran (1905–1998), Lebanese politician
 Adel Safar (born 1953), Syrian politician and academic
 Adel Omar Sherif, Egyptian politician and judge
 Adel Tamano, Filipino educator, lawyer and politician
 Adel Younis (died 1976), Egyptian jurist and politician
 Adel Yzquierdo (born 1945), Cuban politician and engineer
 Adel Zawati (1920–1984), Palestinian politician

Sciences 

 Adel F. Halasa, American scientist
 Adel Mahmoud (1941–2018), Egyptian-American doctor
 Adel Ramzy, Egyptian surgeon
 Adel Sedra (born 1943), Egyptian-Canadian electrical engineer and professor

Sports

Adel Abbas (born 1982), Bahraini footballer
Adel Abdulaziz (born 1980), Emirati footballer
Adel Abdullah (born 1984), Syrian footballer
Adel Adili (born 1974), Libyan long-distance runner
Adel Ahmed (born 1990), Qatari footballer
Adel Ahmed Malalla (born 1961), Qatari footballer
Adel Al-Anezi (born 1977), Kuwaiti footballer
Adel Al-Ghaith, Kuwaiti swimmer
Adel Al-Hammadi (born 1991), Emirati footballer
Adel Al-Hosani (born 1989), Emirati footballer
Adel Al-Kahham (born 1972), Kuwaiti handball player
Adel Al-Muwallad (born 1997), Saudi footballer
Adel Al-Najadah (born 1966), Kuwaiti judoka
Adel Al-Salimi (born 1979), Yemeni footballer
Adel Al-Sulaimane (born 1995), Qatari footballer
Adel Al Chadli (born 2000), Yemeni footballer
Adel Al Mulla (1970–2022), Qatari footballer
Adel Jadoua Ali (born 1981), Qatari footballer
Adel Aljabrin (born 1968), Saudi Arabian archer
Adel Amrouche (born 1968), Belgo-Algerian footballer and manager
Adel Aref (born 1980), Tunisian tennis umpire
Adel Bader (born 1997), Qatari footballer
Adel Basulaiman (born 1982), Emirati footballer
Adel Belal (born 1987), Egyptian footballer
Adel Habib Beldi (born 1994), Algerian footballer
Adel Bettaieb (born 1997), French footballer
Adel Bougueroua (born 1987), Algerian footballer
Adel Bousmal (born 1985), Algerian handball goalkeeper
Adel Belkacem Bouzida (born 2002), Algerian footballer
Adel Chbouki (born 1971), Moroccan footballer
Adel Chedli (born 1976), French footballer
Adel Djerrar (born 1990), Algerian footballer
Adel Eid (born 1984), Finnish footballer
Adel El-Maamour (born 1955), Egyptian football goalkeeper
Adel El-Moalem (born 1946), Egyptian water polo player
Adel El-Sharkawy (born 1966), Egyptian handball player
Adel El Hadi (born 1980), Algerian footballer
Adel Fadaaq (born 1992), Emirati footballer
Adel Fellous (born 1978), French rugby league footballer
Adel Ferdosipour (born 1974), Iranian journalist, football commentator, translator, university professor, and television host and producer
Adel Gafaiti (born 1994), French footballer
Adel Gamal (born 1993), Emirati footballer
Adel Gholami (born 1986), Iranian volleyball player
Adel Guemari (born 1984), French-Algerian footballer
Adel Hamek (born 1992), Algerian badminton player
Adel Hammoude (born 1960), Syrian boxer
Adel Hekal (1934–2018), Egyptian football goalkeeper
Adel Humoud (born 1986), Kuwaiti footballer
Adel Ibrahim Ismail (born 1951), Egyptian basketball player
Adel Khamis (born 1965), Qatari footballer
Adel Khechini (born 1964), Tunisian volleyball player
Adel Khudhair (born 1954), Iraqi footballer and coach
Adel Kolahkaj (born 1985), Iranian footballer
Adel Lakhdari (born 1989), Algerian footballer
Adel Lami (born 1985), Qatari footballer
Adel Langue (born 1997), Mauritian footballer
Adel Massaad (born 1964), Egyptian-German table tennis player
Adel Maïza (born 1983), Algerian footballer
Adel Mechaal (born 1990), Morocco-Spanish runner
Adel Messali (born 1983), Algerian footballer
Adel Mojallali (born 1993), Iranian canoeist
Adel Ibrahim Moustafa (1930–2005), Egyptian wrestler
Adel Namane (born 1987), Algerian footballer
Adel Nasser (born 1970), Iraqi footballer and coach
Adel Nefzi (born 1974), Tunisian footballer
Adel Nima (born 1970), Iraqi footballer and coach
Adel Abdel Rahman (born 1967), Egyptian footballer and manager
Adel Sabeel (born 1998), Emirati footballer
Adel Saqr (born 1986), Emirati footballer
Adel Sarshar (born 1992), Iranian footballer
Adel Sellimi (born 1972), Tunisian footballer and coach
Adel Sennoun (born 1967), Algerian volleyball player
Adel Sesay (born 1990), Sierra Leonean sprinter
Adel Smirani (born 1967), Tunisian footballer
Adel Taarabt (born 1989), Moroccan footballer
Adel Tankova (born 2000), Ukrainian-born Israeli Olympic figure skater
Adel Tlatli, Tunisian basketball coach
Adel Weir (born 1983), South African squash player

Other 

 Adel Abdulhehim (born 1974), Chinese prisoner
 Adel Arnaout (born 1970), Lebanese criminal
 Adel Abdel Bari (born 1960), Egyptian terrorist
 Adel Hassan Hamad (born 1958), Sudan prisoner
 Adel Iskandar (born 1977), British scholar, postcolonial theorist, analyst, and academic
 Adel Ben Mabrouk (born 1970), Tunisian criminal
 Adel Noori (born 1979), Chinese prisoner
 Adel Zaky (1947–2019), Egyptian Roman Catholic prelate

Family name

Arts and entertainment

 Daniel Adel (born 1962), American painter and illustrator
 Sharon den Adel (born 1974), Dutch singer and composer
 Ilunga Adell (born William Adell Stevenson in 1948), American television and film producer, screenwriter and actor
 Joan Elies Adell i Pitarch (born 1968), Catalan-language poet and essayist
 Traci Adell, Playboy Playmate of the Month for July 1994

Politics

Ted Adel, Canadian politician, member of the Legislative Assembly of Yukon

Sciences
Arthur Adel (1908–1994), American astronomer and astrophysicist

Sports
 Carolyn Adel (born 1978), Suriname swimmer and Olympian
 Gun Ädel (born 1938), Swedish cross-country skier
 Jo Adell (born 1999), American baseball player

Fictional characters 
 Adell, a major character in the video game Disgaea 2: Cursed Memories
 Adel Frost, a minor character in the now-discontinued two-dimensional side-scrolling MMORPG Grand Chase
 Adel, a minor antagonist character in the video game Final Fantasy VIII
 Adél, a character in GeGeGe no Kitaro (2018)
 Coco Adel, a character in the RWBY television show and novels

Notes

References

See also 

 Adel (surname)
 Germanic name

Masculine given names
English masculine given names
French masculine given names
Frisian masculine given names
German masculine given names
Germanic masculine given names
Icelandic masculine given names
Norwegian masculine given names
Scandinavian masculine given names
Swedish masculine given names
Unisex given names